Pinky Mitchell was an American boxer who became the first champion in the light welterweight division by receiving the most votes by ballot on November 15, 1922.  He held the title until 1926.

In his impressive career he fought Oakland Jimmy Duffy, and champions Rocky Kansas, James Red Herring, Benny Leonard, Lew Tendler, Jack Britton, Mushy Callahan and Joe Dundee.

Early life
Born Myron Mitchell on January 1, 1899, in Milwaukee, Wisconsin, Mitchell was nicknamed Pinky because of his father's statement, on seeing Mitchell in his crib as a baby, that "he's like a little pink rascal." He was a highly praised amateur boxer, and during his amateur days, former lightweight champion Battling Nelson said he was the best-looking prospect he had seen.

Professional career
Mitchell began boxing professionally in 1917. His brother, Richie Mitchell, was also a boxer. Their two styles were quite different, however. Richie was known for all-action bouts while Pinky, according to a later historian, "became a pariah in Milwaukee rings" due to his "lethargic performances" in boxing matches.

On April 11, 1919, Mitchell drew with Harry Shuman, Pacific Coast Lightweight Champion, in Seattle in a four round match.  The Milwaukee Sentinel noted that he "was pleased at the treatment he had received in Seattle", though he was accustomed to longer fights.

Inaugural world light welterweight champion, 1922
In 1922 Mike Collins, the publisher of a Minneapolis weekly newspaper, the Boxing Blade, created the light welterweight category and asked his readers to vote for the man they felt was the best fighter at 140 pounds. Mitchell won the balloting and was recognized on November 15, 1922, as the first world light welterweight champion. The National Boxing Association (NBA) followed suit and recognized Mitchell as champion.

Mitchell lost to Benny Leonard on May 29, 1923, in a ten round technical knockout in Chicago. Leonard's win was one of many against world champions, though the fight was not a title fight.  As Leonard refused to weigh in, neither his world lightweight or Mitchell's world junior welterweight titles were at stake.     After a slow first five rounds with few blows, Leonard took the lead in the remaining rounds with the exception of the eighth and ninth. In the eight, Mitchell scored with four rights to the chin of Leonard.  Though both boxers scored points, Leonard seemed to have the edge from the fifth. In the tenth, Leonard dropped Pinky to the mat, and upon arising, he knocked him to the mat a second time.  The referee called an end to the match, resulting in a technical knockout. Immediately afterwards, Pinkie's brother Ritchie believed a foul had been committed, claiming Leonard had hit Pinky when he was down on one knee on the mat, but the referee disagreed. The Buffalo Courier wrote that Leonard was in the motions of hitting Pinky when he was on one knee, but that the referee waved him away before the blow occurred.   Regardless, a fight between Richie and Davey Mitchell, the referee, ensued that ended in a near riot among the spectators.  The police put down the protests with their billy clubs, though no arrests were made.  Despite the protests, the charity event ended with a win by Leonard and no foul called by the referee against Mitchell in the tenth.

Mitchell defended his title at least six times. One of those defenses, a 1925 fight against James "Red" Herring, was mired in controversy. Herring won by disqualification and claimed the light welterweight championship. The Wisconsin Commission and the NBA both declined to recognize Herring as champion, however.

Loss of title and career decline, September, 1926
His defense against Mushy Callahan saw Mitchell lose his title decisively on September 21, 1926, in a ten-round points decision. Callahan, who began piling up a points lead from the first round, knocked Mitchell to the canvas in the eighth and tenth. Except for the fourth, which was even, and the sixth, where Mitchell led, Callahan took a strong points margin in all the remaining rounds.     

After losing to Callahan, Mitchell never won another fight and retired in 1928.

After boxing
After he retired, Mitchell twice ran for sheriff of Milwaukee County, losing both times.

He died on March 11, 1976, in Milwaukee, Wisconsin.

Professional boxing record
All information in this section is derived from BoxRec, unless otherwise stated.

Official record

All newspaper decisions are officially regarded as “no decision” bouts and are not counted in the win/loss/draw column.

Unofficial record

Record with the inclusion of newspaper decisions in the win/loss/draw column.

See also
List of light welterweight boxing champions

References and notes

External links

Pinky Mitchell - CBZ Profile
https://titlehistories.com/boxing/na/usa/ny/nysac-jwl.html
https://titlehistories.com/boxing/wba/wba-world-sl.html

|-

1899 births
1976 deaths
Boxers from Wisconsin
World boxing champions
Light-welterweight boxers
Sportspeople from Milwaukee
American male boxers